Engro Fertilizers is a Pakistani fertiliser manufacturing company and is a subsidiary of conglomerate Engro Corporation. The company has a local market share of 30 per cent.

History
Engro Fertilizers was demerged from the parent company Engro Corporation in 2010, and went public in December 2013.

Factory
 Enven Plant

References

External links 
Engro Fertilizers

Engro Corporation
Manufacturing companies based in Karachi
Companies listed on the Pakistan Stock Exchange
Chemical companies established in 2010
Pakistani companies established in 2010
Fertilizer companies of Pakistan